Iker Amorrortu Andrinua (born 17 October 1995) is a Spanish footballer who plays as a right winger for CD Numancia.

Club career
Born in Guernica, Biscay, Basque Country, Amorrortu finished his formation with hometown side Gernika Club, and made his senior debut with farm team Urbieta FT in 2014. In 2015, after only one first team appearance, he moved to Tercera División side Bermeo FT.

In July 2016, Amorrortu moved to SD Eibar's farm team CD Vitoria, also in the fourth division. He contributed with ten goals in his first season as his club achieved promotion to Segunda División B, but featured rarely in his second and moved to CD Basconia on 3 January 2018.

On 23 July 2018, Amorrortu was loaned to third division side SCD Durango, for one year. On 1 July of the following year, after the club's relegation he signed for fellow league team SD Amorebieta.

On 19 June 2020, Amorrortu agreed to a deal with CD Calahorra still in division three. On 8 July of the following year, he returned to Amorebieta, with the club now in Segunda División.

Amorrortu made his professional debut on 14 August 2021, coming on as a late substitute for Gorka Guruzeta in a 0–2 away loss against Girona FC. He scored his first professional goal on 24 October, netting his team's only in a 1–2 home loss against Real Sociedad B.

On 22 January 2022, Amorrortu terminated his contract with the Azules, and joined Segunda División RFEF side CD Numancia five days later.

References

External links

1995 births
Living people
People from Guernica
Sportspeople from Biscay
Spanish footballers
Footballers from the Basque Country (autonomous community)
Association football wingers
Segunda División players
Segunda División B players
Tercera División players
Divisiones Regionales de Fútbol players
Gernika Club footballers
Bermeo FT footballers
CD Vitoria footballers
CD Basconia footballers
SD Amorebieta footballers
CD Calahorra players
CD Numancia players